The Central Air Defense Force (CADF) is an inactive United States Air Force organization.  Its last assignment was with Air Defense Command being stationed at Richards-Gebaur Air Force Base, Missouri.  It was inactivated on July 1, 1960.

History
CADF was an intermediate-level command and control organization of Air Defense Command.  Its origins date to 1 March 1949 when Continental Air Command (ConAC) reorganized Air Defense Command when it became an operating agency.  Air defense units within the Continental United States (CONUS) were given to the Eastern and Western Air Defense Liaison Groups, with Western and Eastern Air Defense Forces activated on 1 September 1949.

Central Air Defense Force (CADF) was activated as a third subordinate region under the re-established Air Defense Command in February 1951 to better organize ADC units in the Central and Southeast United States, its initial region being defined in the west as the area east of the 102nd degree of longitude, from the Canada–US border in the north to the Rio Grande border between the United States and Mexico in the south.  The eastern boundary of the CADF was the area west of the  90th degree of longitude from the Michigan shoreline of Lake Superior south to the  point of the Missouri, Kentucky and Tennessee state boundaries, and eastward to the Atlantic Ocean coastline along the Tennessee–Kentucky and Virginia–North Carolina border, with all areas south and west of those boundaries.

The delineation was again adjusted in March 1956 to the region generally to the east of the 114th degree of longitude, roughly along the eastern borders of Idaho, Nevada and California from the Canada–US border in the north to the Mexican border in the south.  The southeast region east of the Mississippi River to the Gulf of Mexico was reassigned to EADF.

Central Air Defense Force was inactivated on 1 July 1960, with its assigned units reassigned either to 29th, 30th or 33rd Air Divisions, or to the new Air Defense Sectors created with the advent of the Semi Automatic Ground Environment (SAGE) system.

Lineage
 Constituted as Central Air Defense Force (CADF) on 5 February 1951
 Activated on 1 March 1951
 Inactivated on 1 July 1960

Assignments
 Air Defense Command, 1 February 1951 – 1 July 1960

Stations
 Kansas City, Missouri, 5 February 1951
 Grandview AFB, Missouri, 24 February 1954
 Site re-designated: Richards-Gebaur AFB, Missouri, 27 April 1957 – July 1, 1960

Components

Air Divisions

 20th Air Division
 Activated at: Grandview AFB, Missouri on 8 October 1955
 Assigned to Central Air Defense Force
 Site re-designated: Richards-Gebaur AFB, Missouri, 27 April 1957
 Inactivate on 1 July 1960

 29th Air Division
 Stationed at: Great Falls AFB, Montana
 Re-assigned to Central Air Defense Force 16 February 1953 from Western Air Defense Force (WADF)
 Site re-designated: Malmstrom AFB, 15 June 1956
 Re-designated 29th Air Division (SAGE) and reassigned to Air Defense Command, 1 January 1960

 31st Air Division
 Stationed at: Fort Snelling, Minnesota on 20 May 1951
 Re-assigned to Central Air Defense Force 16 February 1953 from Eastern Air Defense Force (EADF)
 Inactivated 1 January 1960

 33d Air Division
 Stationed at: Tinker AFB, Oklahoma, 20 May 1951
 Re-assigned to Central Air Defense Force 16 February 1953 from Eastern Air Defense Force (EADF)
 Moved to Oklahoma City AFS, 1 July 1956
 Re-designated 33d Air Division (SAGE) and reassigned to Air Defense Command, 1 January 1960

 34th Air Division (Defense)
 Stationed at: Kirtland AFB, New Mexico, 16 February 1953
 Re-assigned to Central Air Defense Force 16 February 1953 from Western Air Defense Force (WADF)
 Inactivated 1 January 1960

 35th Air Division
 Activated at: Kansas City, Missouri on 1 July 1951
 Assigned to Central Air Defense Force
 Moved to Dobbins AFB, Georgia on 1 September 1951
 Re-assigned to Eastern Air Defense Force (EADF), 10 April 1955

Wings
 122d Fighter-Interceptor Wing
 Federalized Indiana Air National Guard, 10 February 1951
 Stationed at  Baer Field, Indiana
 Re-assigned to Central Air Defense Force 1 December 1951 from Eastern Air Defense Force (EADF)
 Inactivated and returned to state control, 7 February 1952

 128th Fighter-Interceptor Wing
 Federalized Wisconsin Air National Guard, 10 February 1951
 Stationed at Truax Field, Wisconsin
 Re-assigned to Central Air Defense Force 20 May 1951 from Eastern Air Defense Force (EADF)
 Inactivated and returned to state control, 6 February 1952

 133d Fighter-Interceptor Wing
 Federalized Minnesota Air National Guard, 10 February 1951
 Stationed at Holman Field, Minnesota
 Re-assigned to Central Air Defense Force 20 May 1951 from Eastern Air Defense Force (EADF)
 Moved to Minneapolis-Saint Paul International Airport, 28 June 1951
 Inactivated and returned to state control, 6 February 1952

Groups

 153d Aircraft Control and Warning Group
 Federalized Pennsylvania Air National Guard, 16 January 1952
 Stationed at New Cumberland, Pennsylvania, assigned to Central Air Defense Force
 Personnel used to fill vacancies in the 35th Air Division; inactivated 6 February 1952

 159th Aircraft Control and Warning Group
 Federalized Oklahoma Air National Guard, 1 June 1951
 Stationed at Tinker AFB, Oklahoma
 Attached to 33d Air Division, 19 June 1951
 Inactivated and returned to state control, 6 February 1952

 161st Aircraft Control and Warning Group
 Federalized California Air National Guard, 28 January 1952
 Stationed at Berkeley, California, assigned to Central Air Defense Force
 Personnel used to fill vacancies in numerous CADF units; inactivated 6 February 1952

 543d Aircraft Control and Warning Group
 Assigned to Central Air Defense Force
 Stationed at Fort Snelling, Minnesota on 1 January 1951
 Re-assigned to 31st Air Division (Defense), 10 July 1951

 4676th Air Defense Group
 Assigned to Central Air Defense Force
 Stationed at Grandview AFB, Missouri
 Re-assigned to 33d Air Division, 2 March 1954

See also
 Eastern Air Defense Force
 Western Air Defense Force

References

 USAF Aerospace Defense Command publication, The Interceptor, January 1979 (Volume 21, Number 1)
 Maurer, Maurer (1983). Air Force Combat Units Of World War II. Maxwell AFB, Alabama: Office of Air Force History. 
 Ravenstein, Charles A. (1984). Air Force Combat Wings Lineage and Honors Histories 1947–1977. Maxwell AFB, Alabama: Office of Air Force History. 
  A Handbook of Aerospace Defense Organization 1946 - 1980,  by Lloyd H. Cornett and Mildred W. Johnson, Office of History, Aerospace Defense Center, Peterson Air Force Base, Colorado
 Winkler, David F. (1997), Searching the skies: the legacy of the United States Cold War defense radar program. Prepared for United States Air Force Headquarters Air Combat Command.

External links

Aerospace Defense Command units
1951 establishments in Missouri
1960 disestablishments in Missouri